The 1987 NCAA Division I softball season, play of college softball in the United States organized by the National Collegiate Athletic Association (NCAA) at the Division I level, began in February 1987.  The season progressed through the regular season, many conference tournaments and championship series, and concluded with the 1987 NCAA Division I softball tournament and 1987 Women's College World Series.  The Women's College World Series, consisting of the eight remaining teams in the NCAA Tournament and held in Omaha, Nebraska at Seymour Smith Park, ended on May 24, 1987.

Conference standings

Women's College World Series
The 1987 NCAA Women's College World Series took place from May 20 to May 24, 1987 in Omaha, Nebraska.

Season leaders
Batting
Batting average: .503 – Jill Justin, Northern Illinois Huskies
RBIs: 45 – Jeanne Weinsheim, San Diego Toreros
Home runs: 10 – Tiffany Daniels, Florida State Seminoles

Pitching
Wins: 36-6 – Shawn Andaya, Texas A&M Aggies
ERA: 0.30 (8 ER/185.1 IP) – Kristen Peterson, Adelphi Panthers
Strikeouts: 326 – Shawn Andaya, Texas A&M Aggies

Awards
Honda Sports Award Softball:
Connie Clark, Cal State Fullerton Titans

All America Teams
The following players were members of the All-American Teams.

First Team

Second Team

References